Trinity Lutheran Church is a historic church at 402 E. Constitution in Victoria, Texas.

The corner stone was laid September 10, 1908. On May 2, 1909, Rev. Karl Weiss dedicated the church. In 1986 it was added to the National Register.

See also

National Register of Historic Places listings in Victoria County, Texas

References

Lutheran churches in Texas
Churches on the National Register of Historic Places in Texas
Gothic Revival church buildings in Texas
Churches completed in 1908
20th-century Lutheran churches in the United States
Churches in Victoria County, Texas
National Register of Historic Places in Victoria, Texas
1908 establishments in Texas